Fabrice Jaumont is a French-born author and educator best known for his advocacy for dual-language bilingual education around the world. He is the author of several books translated in multiple languages.

Education and Career 
Born in Valenciennes, France, Fabrice Jaumont moved to the United States in 1997 and served as education attaché for the Embassy of France to the United States. He received a PhD in International Education from New York University with a dissertation on philanthropy and higher education in Africa. He was affiliated with Fondation Maison des Sciences de l'Homme (FMSH) in Paris and the Network for International Policies and Cooperation in Education and Training (NORRAG) in Geneva for research and editorial activities on philanthropy in education. In 2018, he founded the Center for the Advancement of Languages, Education, and Communities, a New York-based nonprofit publishing organization with a focus on multilingualism, cross-cultural understanding, and the empowerment of linguistic communities. The same year, he was invited by French news magazine, French Morning, to host a podcast called Révolution bilingue in which he discusses the various aspects of bilingualism with researchers and practitioners from around the world. A regular keynote speaker in American and international conferences, he speaks about the importance of linguistic diversity and the value of multilingualism.

The Bilingual Revolution 
In 2005, a group of French parents and educators in New York worked towards expanding the number of French dual-language programs in the city's public schools. Their grassroots approach, which was later coined the "bilingual revolution", involved organizing parents and community leaders in several neighborhoods of Brooklyn, Harlem, and the Bronx. This method was later replicated by other linguistic communities in New York and other cities, enabling the development of bilingual and language immersion programs in several languages, in particular French, Italian, German, Russian, Japanese, Chinese, Polish, Spanish and Arabic. For his role in this movement, the New York Times nicknamed Fabrice Jaumont the "Godfather of language immersion programs" in 2014. The same year, the French newspaper Les Echos included him in its list of most influential French people for his efforts in expanding bilingual education programs.

In 2017, he published The Bilingual Revolution: The Future of Education is in Two Languages. The book was translated in ten languages and led to discussions on the value of bilingual education as a global advantage, as a social innovation, and as a way to fight discrimination and racial inequalities while supporting heritage languages and empowering linguistic communities.

Works 

 Conversations on Bilingualism (TBR Books)
 French All Around Us: French Language and Francophone Culture in the United States (TBR Books).
 Unequal Partners: American Foundations and Higher Education Development in Africa (Palgrave)
 The Bilingual Revolution: The Future of Education is in Two Languages (TBR Books)
 Stanley Kubrick: The Odysseys (Book Case Engine)
 The Gift of Languages: Paradigm Shift in Foreign Language Education (TBR Books)
 Partenaires inégaux: fondations américaines et universités en Afrique (Editions Maison des sciences de l’homme)

Honors & Awards 

 The James W. Dodge Foreign Language Advocate. NECTFL New York, NY (2020)
 New York Bilingual Fair Leader Award. French Morning. New York, NY (2019)
 Knight in the National Order of Academic Palms (2012)
 Medal of Recognition. Committee of French-speaking Societies of the United States (2015)
 Cultural Diversity Award. Organisation internationale de la Francophonie and Committee of French-speaking ambassadors to the United Nations (2016).

References

External links 
 Personal Website

Education activists
Year of birth missing (living people)
Living people